In the geometry of hyperbolic 3-space, the order-4-4 pentagonal honeycomb a regular space-filling tessellation (or honeycomb). Each infinite cell consists of a pentagonal tiling whose vertices lie on a 2-hypercycle, each of which has a limiting circle on the ideal sphere.

Geometry
The Schläfli symbol of the order-4-4 pentagonal honeycomb is {5,4,4}, with four order-4 pentagonal tilings meeting at each edge. The vertex figure of this honeycomb is a square tiling, {4,4}.

Related polytopes and honeycombs 
It is a part of a series of regular polytopes and honeycombs with {p,4,4} Schläfli symbol, and square tiling vertex figures:

Order-4-4 hexagonal honeycomb

In the geometry of hyperbolic 3-space, the order-4-4 hexagonal honeycomb a regular space-filling tessellation (or honeycomb). Each infinite cell consists of an order-4 hexagonal tiling whose vertices lie on a 2-hypercycle, each of which has a limiting circle on the ideal sphere.

The Schläfli symbol of the octagonal tiling honeycomb is {6,4,4}, with three octagonal tilings meeting at each edge.  The vertex figure of this honeycomb is a square tiling, {4,4}.

Order-4-4 apeirogonal honeycomb

In the geometry of hyperbolic 3-space, the order-4-4 apeirogonal honeycomb a regular space-filling tessellation (or honeycomb). Each infinite cell consists of an order-4 apeirogonal tiling whose vertices lie on a 2-hypercycle, each of which has a limiting circle on the ideal sphere.

The Schläfli symbol of the apeirogonal tiling honeycomb is {∞,4,4}, with three order-4 apeirogonal tilings meeting at each edge.  The vertex figure of this honeycomb is a square tiling, {4,4}.

See also 
 Convex uniform honeycombs in hyperbolic space
 List of regular polytopes

References 

Coxeter, Regular Polytopes, 3rd. ed., Dover Publications, 1973. . (Tables I and II: Regular polytopes and honeycombs, pp. 294–296)
 The Beauty of Geometry: Twelve Essays (1999), Dover Publications,  (Chapter 10, Regular Honeycombs in Hyperbolic Space) Table III
 Jeffrey R. Weeks The Shape of Space, 2nd edition  (Chapters 16–17: Geometries on Three-manifolds I,II)
 George Maxwell, Sphere Packings and Hyperbolic Reflection Groups, JOURNAL OF ALGEBRA 79,78-97 (1982) 
 Hao Chen, Jean-Philippe Labbé, Lorentzian Coxeter groups and Boyd-Maxwell ball packings, (2013)
 Visualizing Hyperbolic Honeycombs arXiv:1511.02851 Roice Nelson, Henry Segerman (2015)

External links 
John Baez, Visual insights: {7,3,3} Honeycomb (2014/08/01) {7,3,3} Honeycomb Meets Plane at Infinity (2014/08/14) 
 Danny Calegari, Kleinian, a tool for visualizing Kleinian groups, Geometry and the Imagination 4 March 2014. 

Honeycombs (geometry)
Pentagonal tilings
Isogonal 3-honeycombs
Isochoric 3-honeycombs
Order-4-n 3-honeycombs
Order-n-4 3-honeycombs
Regular 3-honeycombs